Open Options Corporation is a privately owned business strategy consulting company that specializes in applied game theory and business war games where there are multiple stakeholders who can all influence the final outcome of a particular situation.

Open Options’ original software development was funded by the CIA through a company called Waterloo Engineering Software. The software was designed to help the American government better anticipate the collapse of the Soviet Union into many different breakaway republics. The software was based on academic research by Dr. Niall Fraser from the University of Waterloo. Dr. Fraser has written several books on game theory including Mathematical Modeling of Resolutions of Conflict and Conflict Analysis: Models and Resolutions. Open Options is led by Canadian Engineer, Management Scientist and businessman Tim Jeske.

Open Options uses a type of game theory called Ordinal Non-cooperative Game Theory which is a less well-known sub-section of game theory. However, this approach and proprietary software enables Open Options to analyze millions of possible outcomes.

References

External links
Official Website

Game theory
Business planning
Strategy consulting firms